Ganesh Prasad Singh is a Nepalese politician and Minister for Water Resources and Energy Development of Karnali Province. He is also a member of Provincial Assembly of Karnali Province belonging to the CPN (Maoist Centre). Singh, a resident of Nalgad, was elected via 2017 Nepalese provincial elections from Jajarkot 1(A).

Electoral history

2017 Nepalese provincial elections

References

Living people
Year of birth missing (living people)
21st-century Nepalese politicians
Members of the Provincial Assembly of Karnali Province
People from Jajarkot District
Communist Party of Nepal (Maoist Centre) politicians